Lara Cvjetko (born 1 September 2001) is a Croatian judoka. She won the silver medal in the women's 70kg event at the 2022 World Judo Championships held in Tashkent, Uzbekistan.

She lost her bronze medal match in the women's 70kg event at the 2022 Mediterranean Games held in Oran, Algeria.

References

External links
 
 
 

Living people
2001 births
Place of birth missing (living people)
Croatian female judoka
Competitors at the 2022 Mediterranean Games
Mediterranean Games competitors for Croatia
21st-century Croatian women